Horst Haug (born 12 May 1946) is a retired German football player. He spent six seasons in the Bundesliga with VfB Stuttgart. The best league finish he achieved was fifth place.

References

External links
 

1946 births
Living people
German footballers
VfB Stuttgart players
Stuttgarter Kickers players
Bundesliga players
2. Bundesliga players
Association football midfielders
Footballers from Stuttgart